The TAXI Museum  (traditional Chinese: 計程車博物館; simplified Chinese: 計程车博物馆; pinyin: Jì chéng chē bówùguǎn) is an automobile museum of taxis in Su'ao, Yilan County, Taiwan. The museum was established in 2019, and it displays several taxis and more than 2,000 taxi-related exhibits. The TAXI Museum is the first museum displays taxis in the world.

History 
Lee Chi-Cheng (Chinese:李濟成; pinyin: Lǐ jì chéng), director of the TAXI Museum, began to collect various taxi-related items after bought a toy taxi which the plate number is "NYC-1009" in New York City in 2000.

Collections

NYC Taxi toy
The first collection Lee Chi-Cheng bought when he was traveling in New York City in 2000. The plate number "NYC-1009" is same as his birthday: 9 October.

Taxis

 1947 WILLYS JEEP MB GPW
 1957 MERCEDES-BENZ W123
 1962 Nissan BLUEBIRD P312
 1967 Austin FX4
 1972 CHECKER MARATHON
 1980 裕隆 YUE LOONG 勝利 CEDRIC 803DL
 1983 MERCEDES-BENZ W120
 1988 Peugeot 505
 1988 裕隆 YUE LOONG 速利 Sunny 303
  Peugeot 406 in Taxi (Replica)
 2001 TOYOTA CROWN CONFORT (Red from Metropolitan Area)
 2001 TOYOTA CROWN CONFORT (Green from New Territories)
 2001 TOYOTA CROWN CONFORT (Blue from Lantau Island)
 2002 Nissan CEFIRO A33

The taxi which clipped by TransAsia Airways Flight 235
A Volkswagen CADDY MAXI taxi which clipped by TransAsia Airways Flight 235 at Huandong Viaduct before the plane crashed into the Keelung River. The taxi protected the driver's and the passenger's lives after it hit by the plane.

Other collections
Cycle rickshaw from Taiwan and Indonesia
Tuk-Tuk
Taxi displays
Taximeter
A 1920s mechanical Taximeter from India
Model taxis
Any kinds of taxi-related exhibits, like CDs, books, toys, clothes, etc.

References

External links 
 

Automotive museums
Museums established in 2019
Museums in Yilan County, Taiwan